Jorge Oyarbide (6 July 1944 – 14 November 2013) was a Uruguayan footballer. He played seven matches and scored four goals for the Uruguay national team from 1961 to 1967. He was also part of Uruguay's 1967 South American Championship winning squad.

Career statistics

International

Scores and results list Uruguay's goal tally first, score column indicates score after each Oyarbide goal.

Honours
Uruguay
South American Championship: 1967

References

External links
 

1944 births
2013 deaths
Uruguayan footballers
Uruguay international footballers
Place of birth missing
Association football forwards
Club Nacional de Football players
Grêmio Foot-Ball Porto Alegrense players
Atlético Junior footballers
C.A. Bella Vista players
Defensor Sporting players
C.D. Veracruz footballers
Uruguayan expatriate footballers
Expatriate footballers in Brazil
Expatriate footballers in Colombia
Expatriate footballers in Mexico